KWIC (99.3 MHz) is an American FM radio station broadcasting a classic hits format. Licensed to Topeka, Kansas, U.S., the station is currently owned by Cumulus Media.

Programming
Beginning with the 2014-15 season, KWIC, along with KMAJ (AM) (1440), will be home to the Kansas Jayhawks football and basketball (men/women's) teams. Previously, the games had been aired on WIBW (AM) (580).

References

External links

WIC (FM)
Classic hits radio stations in the United States
Cumulus Media radio stations
Radio stations established in 1992